PERC or perc may refer to:

 PERC Reporting Standard, the European standard for mineral reporting
 PERC solar cell, a passivated emitter rear contact (PERC) solar cell
 Pan-European Regional Council, the European trade union arm of the International Trade Union Confederation
 Dell PERC (PowerEdge RAID Controller), computer hardware used in Dell PowerEdge servers
 Propane Education and Research Council, a lobbying organization
 Property and Environment Research Center, a free-market environmentalist think tank
 PTC Perc, a line of Java virtual machines acquired by Atego (company)
 Pulmonary Embolism Rule-out Criteria (PERC Rule), a clinical decision-making tool to aid in the diagnosis of chest pain and/or dyspnea
 Tetrachloroethylene or perc, a chemical widely used for dry cleaning and metal-degreasing

See also 
 Perk (disambiguation)
 PERQ a model of computer